Dacrycarpus kinabaluensis is a species of shrubby conifer in the family Podocarpaceae. It is found only on Mount Kinabalu in Sabah, Malaysian Borneo.

References

kinabaluensis
Endemic flora of Borneo
Trees of Borneo
Flora of Sabah
Taxonomy articles created by Polbot
Plants described in 1941
Flora of Mount Kinabalu